The blue-billed teal, spotted teal or Hottentot teal (Spatula hottentota) is a species of dabbling duck of the genus Spatula. It is migratory resident in eastern and southern Africa, from Sudan and Ethiopia west to Niger and Nigeria and south to South Africa and Namibia. In west Africa and Madagascar it is sedentary.

The blue-billed teal breed year round, depending on rainfall, and stay in small groups or pairs. They build nests above water in tree stumps and use vegetation.  Ducklings leave the nest soon after hatching, and the mother's parenting is limited to providing protection from predators and leading young to feeding areas. This species is omnivorous and prefers smaller shallow bodies of water.

The blue-billed teal is one of the species to which the Agreement on the Conservation of African-Eurasian Migratory Waterbirds (AEWA) applies. The status of the blue-billed teal on the IUCN Red List is Least Concern.

Several authorities still refer to this species as the Hottentot teal, however, as the word "Hottentot" is an offensive term for the Khoisan people, there has been a movement to change the vernacular name.

Taxonomy 
Spatula hottentota was previously placed in the genus Anas, called Anas punctata. This name was suppressed owing to confusion over type specimens. It has been also referred as Anas hottentota. and Querquedula hottentota.Blue-billed teal is considered monotypic, with no subspecies being recognised.

 Description 

 Identification 
Adult males have dark brown crown contrasting with paler face, throat, breast and side except for a blackish thumb-shaped patch on the ear region. The back of the neck is spotted with black and this spotting extends down through the neck and become intensively spotted on the breast, the spots appear to be larger and less obvious on the light brown flanks and abdomen, and the posterior underparts and under tail coverts becoming vermiculated with black. The scapulars and tail are dark brown to black, the upper wing surface is blackish as well, with the coverts giving a greenish gloss. An iridescent green speculum exists on the secondaries, bounded posteriorly by narrow black and terminal white bars. The iris is brown, the legs and feet are bluish gray, and the bill is light bluish gray with a blackish culmen and nail.

Females have browner crowns, they have less contrasting facial markings and more rounded scapulars, the under tail coverts are not vermiculated, and the wing is less glossy and colorful than that of an adult male.

Juveniles resemble adult females but are duller throughout the body and less distinctively marked with spots. Ducklings have grayish brown underparts and yellowish grey below, the cheeks is paler with pinky puff wash and grey-brown ear patch.

See External Links for duck external anatomy.

 Measurements and weights 
The blue-billed teal was described as the smallest known duck by D. D. Thomas  and J. B. Condy in 1965.

 Length: 330–350 mm
 Weight: 53-288 g
 Wing: 147–157 mm
 Tail: 55–66 mm
 Bill: 32–42 mm
 Eggs: 43×33 mm in average, creamy, 25 g

 Distribution and habitat 
The range of the blue-billed teal extends in Africa from Angola, Zambia, eastern Congo, Malawi, northern Mozambique, Tanzania, Kenya, Uganda, southern Ethiopia, Sudan and Madagascar. They are mainly found in tropical eastern Africa: Ethiopia to Cape Province, westward to northern Botswana and Namibia, and Madagascar.

See External Links for their distribution map.

The blue-billed teal prefers habitats with abundant floating-leaf plants and fringe vegetations, including shallow fresh-water swamps, marshes, streams, shallow small lakes and ponds with fringed edges of reeds or papyrus. They are observed to spend the twilight and night hours dabbling in very shallow waters and move  to deeper and safer parts of the marsh during daytime.

 Behavior 
The blue-billed teal is sedentary in West Africa and Madagascar but partly migratory elsewhere, following a regular but unpredictable short-distance migration routes (up to 700 km) in southern and eastern Africa in response to changing water levels.

 Feeding and diet 
The blue-billed teal prefers feeding at muddy edges, it will also feed on lands and flooded fields like rice paddies, and in waterside that is disturbed heavily by livestock. It feeds  in well-vegetated areas by dabbling, swimming or on foot. No diving during foraging is recorded. It is omnivorous, although its diet consists mainly of grass seeds, especially of the grass Sacciolepis, however it may also consume aquatic invertebrates almost exclusively such as crustaceans like ostracods, molluscs, water insects such as beetles and their larvae, if these are super abundant.

 Molt 
Molt is poorly understood in the blue-billed teal, there is no identified eclipse plumage in males, but breeding males are much brighter than females and the breast spots are more distinct.

 Vocalization 
Both sexes produce series of clicking notes, given as harsh ke-ke-ke when they are disturbed, during flying or within flock. Males produce a highly distinctive wooden rattling call that sounds like a mechanical rattle, while the female has a typical quack and a decrescendo call of only a few notes.

 Social behavior and reproduction 
The breeding behavior of the blue-billed teal is relatively undemonstrative. Based on current research, the bond of blue-billed teal does not extend beyond the female's incubation period, suggesting the bond is presumably reestablished annually. Although majority of breeding is observed in summer, this species also breed in winter, and thus courtship behavior can be seen throughout the whole year.  The most common display in this species is the combination of female inciting and male turning the back of the head. Female blue-billed teal incites males by doing lateral movements silently or nearly silently, and males usually respond by swimming ahead and turning the back of the head. However, the males may respond by drinking, they raise their neck vertically and produce a soft mechanical series of call notes (burping) and they sometimes combine these two displays in a burp-drinking order. Moreover, during social display, the duck frequently perform a wing-flapping and both-wing-stretch sequence of behavior that seems to be a significant part of the display. Pre-copulatory behavior consists of mutual head pumping, and post-copulatory display by the male may vary from no perceptible activity to a swimming shake, wing flapping, or burping. The female most usually only bathes after copulation. The cluster size for this species ranges from 6 to 8 eggs with 7 being the most frequently encountered number. However, based on Clark's observation on the Witwatersrand, the ducklings in families ranges from 1 to 7 with 3 predominating. Incubation period ranges from 25 to 27 days for naturally incubated clutches. The male may remain nearby as the female incubates, but there is no indication of further male participation in brood rearing. So far as is known, the species is not multiple-brooded, although nest failure may lead to re-nesting.

 Status and conservation 
It is a least concern species on  the IUCN Red List. However, habitat degradation is a threat to this species. Protecting wetland and waterside vegetation and controlling hunting will help maintain the population.

References

Clements, James, (2007) The Clements Checklist of the Birds of the World, Cornell University Press, Ithaca
 IUCN (2009) BirdLife International  Downloaded on 08 Jan 2009'''

External links

 Hottentot teal at thebigzoo.com
 Species text in The Atlas of Southern African Birds.
Distribution Map
Duck External Anatomy 

blue-billed teal
Birds of Sub-Saharan Africa
Birds of Southern Africa
blue-billed teal
blue-billed teal